Kaalpurush may refer to:
 Kaalpurush, a 1994 Indian Bengali action film starring Prosenjit Chatterjee
 Kaalpurush, a 2005 Indian Bengali drama film directed by Buddhadev Dasgupta